William Charles Wantland (born April 14, 1934) is an American Anglican Bishop. He is a former Bishop of the Episcopal Diocese of Eau Claire.

Biography
Wantland was born in Edmond, Oklahoma. He is of Seminole, Chickasaw and Choctaw descent. In 1973 Wantland, his, wife, and their children were declared citizens of the Seminole Nation of Oklahoma by adoption.

Prior to becoming a member of the clergy, Wantland was a practicing attorney. He served as municipal judge of Seminole, Oklahoma and on the Seminole City Council. He also served as vice-mayor of Seminole. He was attorney general for the Seminole Nation from 1969 to 1972 and from 1975 to 1977. In 1971, Wantland was the executive director of Seminole Housing Authority, and he served as its attorney general from 1971 until 1977.

Upon the advice of the Bishop of the Episcopal Diocese of Oklahoma, Wantland became a worker-priest at his local church. He later became a full-time priest.

Wantland became Bishop of the Diocese of Eau Claire in 1980. During that time, he was honored by the Lac Courte Oreilles Band of Lake Superior Chippewa Indians. He was embraced as one their own and was given the name 'Manido Nigani', meaning "He who stands forth in the Spirit", referencing his position as an Episcopal bishop.

After retiring from the Diocese of Eau Claire in 1999, Wantland helped to form the Anglican Church in North America. He was a founding member of the ACNA House of Bishops and helped write the ACNA Constitution and Canons. Wantland also serves as Assisting Bishop of the Episcopal Diocese of Fort Worth. He became the first chief justice of the Supreme Court of the Seminole Nation in 2011.

Additionally, Wantland has been a member of the faculty at the University of Oklahoma College of Law and Seminole State College. He is also a published author of a number of books.

Education
Seminole High School - Seminole, Oklahoma
Seminole State College
University of Oklahoma
George Washington University
University of Hawaii
Oklahoma City University
Oklahoma City University School of Law
Geneva-St. Alban's Theological College
Canterbury Christ Church University
University of Cambridge
St. Deiniol's Library, now Gladstone's Library
College of Preachers

Family
Charles W. Wantland, Wantland's grandfather

References

1934 births
Living people
American people of Chickasaw descent
American people of Choctaw descent
People from Edmond, Oklahoma
People from Seminole, Oklahoma
Religious leaders from Wisconsin
21st-century Anglican bishops in the United States
Bishops of the Anglican Church in North America
University of Oklahoma alumni
George Washington University alumni
University of Hawaiʻi alumni
Oklahoma City University alumni
Oklahoma City University School of Law alumni
Alumni of Canterbury Christ Church University
Alumni of the University of Cambridge
Seminole State College (Oklahoma) alumni
Nashotah House faculty
University of Oklahoma faculty
Oklahoma lawyers
Oklahoma city council members
Oklahoma state court judges
Writers from Oklahoma
Writers from Wisconsin
Native American Episcopalians
Episcopal bishops of Eau Claire
Episcopal bishops of Navajoland
Seminole Nation of Oklahoma people